I Wanna Be a Sailor is a 1937 Warner Bros. Merrie Melodies cartoon film directed by Tex Avery. The short was released on September 25, 1937.

Plot
A mother parrot in a cage is teaching her three children to say, "Polly want a cracker." The first two kids, Patrick and Patricia, do so after some effort, but Peter boldly refuses, pointing at a framed photo of his dad he states, "I don't want a cracker! I wanna be a sailor, like me pop." His mother immediately begins deriding her husband, telling Peter that right after he and his siblings were born, their dad had set sail for Hawaii ("No, Maw, it was Catalina," Dad, as she remembers him, reminds her). She  tells her son, "I used to burn a little light in the window" (it was actually a searchlight), hoping for his dad's return, but he never did come back.

Nonetheless, Peter stubbornly stomps off to become a sailor. He bumps into a barrel, from which he builds a ship with a red pajama for a sail and a skull-and-crossbones label from a poison bottle for a Jolly Roger flag. He joins forces with an annoyingly loquacious duck (whom he silences by clamping his beak shut with a clothespin), and the two set sail on the lake - Peter as captain, the duck as deck-swab. They eventually run into trouble in a thunderstorm (which the duck revels in, being more accustomed to water) and end up overboard. Peter calls out for his "Momma".  She comes running, but the duck has already saved him. Despite it all, Peter still wants to be a sailor, which causes his mother to faint.

Notes
The voice of Peter Parrot was supplied by prolific child actor Robert "Bobby" Winckler, who had worked in more than 80 films and 200 radio shows with most of the stars of the Golden Age of Hollywood. His IMDB page is listed under his often-credited name Robert Winkler.
The duck in this cartoon is often thought to be the same duck that appeared in the Porky Pig cartoons It's an Ill Wind and Porky's Hotel, as well as She Was an Acrobat's Daughter.
During the storm sequence, the cartoon's soundtrack music includes a few bars from the second movement of Gioacchino Rossini's William Tell Overture.
The mother parrot sings part of the chorus of the song "Poor Old Joe" as she comes to Peter's rescue ("I'm coming...").
I Wanna Be a Sailor is the first Warner Bros. cartoon to end with the 1937-38 Merrily We Roll Along rendition.
This cartoon is one of a handful of pre-1943 shorts to enter the public domain in the United States because United Artists, the owners of the short at the time, failed to renew the copyrights in time, though they had planned to do so. It is the oldest color Warner Bros. cartoon to currently be in the public domain, entering in 1966.
While this short was never released on home media in a restored format, MeTV aired an unreleased restored print of this short on Toon In with Me.

Home media
LaserDisc - The Golden Age of Looney Tunes, Volume 3, Side 5, unrestored
DVD - Kid Galahad (1937 film), dubbed version

References

Films directed by Tex Avery
Merrie Melodies short films
Warner Bros. Cartoons animated short films
1937 animated films
1937 films
Fictional parrots
Films scored by Carl Stalling
1930s American films